Bryce Easton (born 5 September 1987) is a South African professional golfer who plays on the Challenge Tour and the Sunshine Tour.

Easton was born in Durban. He joined the Sunshine Tour in 2011 and finished in 46th on the Order of Merit in his rookie season. On 26 May 2012, he picked up his first win on Tour at the Sun City Challenge. Easton eagled the final hole of the tournament to force a playoff with Brandon Pieters, Allan Versfeld, and Andrew Georgiou. He then shot another eagle to win the playoff. He picked up his second win two weeks later at the Vodacom Origins of Golf (Zebula).

Amateur wins
2005 KZN Invitational, Zululand Open

Professional wins (4)

Sunshine Tour wins (3)

Sunshine Tour playoff record (1–0)

Big Easy Tour wins (1)

Results in World Golf Championships

"T" = Tied

See also
2022 Challenge Tour graduates

References

External links

South African male golfers
Sunshine Tour golfers
Asian Tour golfers
University of Texas at Arlington alumni
Sportspeople from Durban
White South African people
1987 births
Living people